Androgynoceras is an extinct genus of cephalopod belonging to the ammonite subclass. The Green Ammonite Beds of the Dorset Coast are named after Androgynoceras lataecosta which has chambers filled with green calcite.

Distribution
Jurassic of Austria, France, Germany, Serbia and Montenegro, Spain, Switzerland and the United Kingdom

References

External links
 GBIF

Jurassic ammonites of Europe
Liparoceratidae
Ammonitida genera
Fossils of Serbia